The Women's triple jump event at the 2013 European Athletics Indoor Championships was held on March 1, 2013 at 18:40 (qualification) and March 3, 11:05 (final) local time.

Records

Results

Qualification
Qualification: Qualification Performance 14.10 (Q) or at least 8 best performers advanced to the final.

Final
The final was held at 11:05.

References

Triple jump at the European Athletics Indoor Championships
2013 European Athletics Indoor Championships
2013 in women's athletics